Baby D or Baby Dee may refer to:

Baby D (dance group), a dance group from the UK
Baby D (rapper), an underground rapper from Atlanta
Baby D, a fictional character in the 2000 film Next Friday
Baby Dee, a performance artist, multi-instrumentalist and singer-songwriter